The Statenville Consolidated School, also known as Echols County High School, is located on Georgia Highway 94 in Statenville, Georgia, United States. It was built in 1931 and enlarged in 1938–39.  It was listed on the National Register of Historic Places in 1988.

It is a one-story brick building of simple design by noted Valdosta architect Lloyd Greer (1885-1952).

The school was funded by a county bond issue which provided for an auditorium to be included.  From 1931 to the date of NRHP listing, the auditorium was the largest meeting space in Echols County and thus has been a social and entertainment center.

References

School buildings on the National Register of Historic Places in Georgia (U.S. state)
Late 19th and Early 20th Century American Movements architecture
Gothic Revival architecture in Georgia (U.S. state)
School buildings completed in 1939
National Register of Historic Places in Echols County, Georgia
1931 establishments in Georgia (U.S. state)